Ward Smith (born May 3, 1947) was a Canadian football player who played for the Calgary Stampeders, BC Lions, Winnipeg Blue Bombers, Montreal Alouettes and Toronto Argonauts of the Canadian Football League (CFL). He played college football at Boise State University.

References

1947 births
American football running backs
Canadian football running backs
Boise State Broncos football players
Calgary Stampeders players
BC Lions players
Winnipeg Blue Bombers players
Montreal Alouettes players
Toronto Argonauts players
Players of Canadian football from Alberta
Canadian football people from Calgary
Living people